is a former Japanese football player. He played for Japan national team.

Club career
Sakashita was born in Miura on May 6, 1959. After graduating from University of Tsukuba, he joined Fujita Industries in 1982. He played as regular player at the club. However, the club was relegated to Division 2 in 1990. He moved to Yomiuri in 1990 and retired in 1991. He played 161 games and scored 5 goals in the league.

National team career
In December 1980, when Sakashita was a University of Tsukuba student, he was selected Japan national team for 1982 World Cup qualification. At this qualification, on December 28, he debuted against Macau.

Club statistics

National team statistics

References

External links
 
 Japan National Football Team Database

1959 births
Living people
University of Tsukuba alumni
People from Miura, Kanagawa
Association football people from Kanagawa Prefecture
Japanese footballers
Japan international footballers
Japan Soccer League players
Shonan Bellmare players
Tokyo Verdy players
Association football defenders